Rich Perry is an American jazz tenor saxophonist from Cleveland, Ohio.

Perry attended Bowling Green State University for a year before moving to New York. He toured with the Glenn Miller Orchestra in 1975 and with The Thad Jones/Mel Lewis Orchestra the following year. He has also played with Chet Baker, Paul Bley, Machito, Bob Moses, Jack McDuff, Billy Hart, Eddie Gómez, Tom Harrell, and Harold Danko. He has recorded as a leader since 1993 on SteepleChase Records.

Perry is currently a member of the Vanguard Jazz Orchestra as well as the Maria Schneider Orchestra. He is an adjunct faculty member of the William Paterson University jazz program.

Discography

As leader or co-leader
 To Start Again (SteepleChase, 1993)
 Beautiful Love (SteepleChase, 1994)
 What Is This? (SteepleChase, 1995)
 Left Alone (SteepleChase, 1997)
 RichLee! (SteepleChase, 1997) – with Lee Konitz
 Canções do Brasil (SteepleChase, 2000)
 So in Love (SteepleChase, 2000)
 Doxy (SteepleChase, 2000)
 O Grand Amor (SteepleChase, 2001)
 Hearsay (SteepleChase, 2002)
 At Eastman (SteepleChase, 2003)
 East of the Sun and West of 2nd Avenue (SteepleChase, 2004)
 You're My Everything (SteepleChase, 2005)
 Rhapsody (SteepleChase, 2006)
 At the Kitano, Vol. 1 (SteepleChase, 2006)
 E-Motion (SteepleChase, 2007)
 At the Kitano, Vol. 2 (SteepleChase, 2008)
 Gone (SteepleChase, 2010)
 At the Kitano, Vol. 3 (SteepleChase, 2010)
 Grace (SteepleChase, 2011)
 Time Was (SteepleChase, 2010)
 Nocturne (SteepleChase, 2014)
 Organique (SteepleChase, 2015)
 Mood (SteepleChase, 2016)
 Other Matters (SteepleChase, 2019)
 Everything Happens (SteepleChase, 2022)

As sideman
 Paul Bley  Speechless – with Victor Lewis
 Sila Cevikce A New Abode
 John Fedchock New York Big Band Up and Running, No Nonsense, On the Edge
 Christian Finger Merge into Beauty
  Waltz for Sharon Stone (mja Records, 1997)
 Joe Henderson The Joe Henderson Big Band
 Fred Hersch Songs Without Words, Point in Time, Forward Motion
 Aaron Irwin Into the Light
 Clay Jenkins Matters of Time
 Steve Lampert Venus Perplexed, Music from There
 Andy LaVerne Pianissimo
 Pete Malinverni Invisible Cities
 Ron McClure Soft Hands, Dream Team, Double Triangle – with Tim Hagans, Mark Copeland, Billy Hart
 George Mraz Bottom Lines, Mraz Jazz – with Richie Beirach, Al Foster
 Jeanfrançois Prins El Gaucho – with Victor Lewis
 Rufus Reid The Gait Keeper, Live at the Kennedy Center
 Dave Scott Song for Amy, Naivete, Nonchalant
 Dave Stryker Blue to the Bone, Big Room
 Vanguard Jazz Orchestra Up from the Skies, The Way, Can I Persuade You, Lickety Split, The Thad Jones Legacy
 Gary Versace Time and Again

References

Bowling Green State University alumni
Living people
American jazz saxophonists
American male saxophonists
Musicians from Cleveland
SteepleChase Records artists
1949 births
21st-century American saxophonists
Jazz musicians from Ohio
21st-century American male musicians
American male jazz musicians